10/25/00 – San Diego, California is a two-disc live album and the sixty-fourth in a series of 72 live bootlegs released by the American alternative rock band Pearl Jam from the band's 2000 Binaural Tour. It was released along with the other official bootlegs from the second North American leg of the tour on March 27, 2001.

Overview
The album was recorded on October 25, 2000, in San Diego, California at the San Diego Sports Arena. It was selected by the band as one of 18 "Ape/Man" shows from the tour, which, according to bassist Jeff Ament, were shows the band found "really exciting." Allmusic gave it two and a half out of a possible five stars. Allmusic staff writer Steven Jacobetz called it a "flawed but psychologically revealing performance, which is absolutely essential for serious Pearl Jam collectors, or for anyone curious about the band's state of mind near the end of a hard year of touring." "Jeremy" from this show appears on the Touring Band 2000 DVD.

Track listing

Disc one
"Long Road" (Eddie Vedder) – 6:34
"Breakerfall" (Vedder) – 2:37
"Corduroy" (Dave Abbruzzese, Jeff Ament, Stone Gossard, Mike McCready, Vedder) – 4:36
"Whipping" (Abbruzzese, Ament, Gossard, McCready, Vedder) – 2:45
"Gods' Dice" (Ament) – 2:34
"Animal" (Abbruzzese, Ament, Gossard, McCready, Vedder) – 3:44
"Given to Fly" (McCready, Vedder) – 3:45
"Even Flow" (Vedder, Gossard) – 6:41
"Wishlist" (Vedder) – 3:51
"Rearviewmirror" (Abbruzzese, Ament, Gossard, McCready, Vedder) – 6:24
"Rival" (Gossard) – 4:00
"Jeremy" (Vedder, Ament) – 5:02
"Pilate" (Ament) – 3:02
"MFC" (Vedder) – 2:32
"Daughter" (Abbruzzese, Ament, Gossard, McCready, Vedder) – 7:11
"Soon Forget" (Vedder) – 2:06

Disc two
"Immortality" (Abbruzzese, Ament, Gossard, McCready, Vedder) – 7:49
"Insignificance" (Vedder) – 4:37
"Go" (Abbruzzese, Ament, Gossard, McCready, Vedder) – 3:29
"Encore Break" – 2:25
"Don't Be Shy" (Cat Stevens) – 2:56
"In My Tree" (Gossard, Jack Irons, Vedder) – 3:51
"State of Love and Trust" (Vedder, McCready, Ament) – 3:27
"Once" (Vedder, Gossard) – 4:23
"Elderly Woman Behind the Counter in a Small Town" (Abbruzzese, Ament, Gossard, McCready, Vedder) – 3:26
"Black" (Vedder, Gossard) – 7:20
"Parting Ways" (Vedder) – 7:53
"Yellow Ledbetter" (Ament, McCready, Vedder) – 6:01

Personnel
Pearl Jam
Jeff Ament – bass guitar, design concept
Matt Cameron – drums
Stone Gossard – guitars
Mike McCready – guitars
Eddie Vedder – vocals, guitars, ukulele

Production
John Burton – engineering
Brett Eliason – mixing
Brad Klausen – design and layout

References

Pearl Jam Official Bootlegs
2001 live albums
Epic Records live albums